Managing Derivatives Contracts is a reference work on Financial Derivatives by Khader Shaik. This book is primarily focused on derivatives market structure, contract life cycle, operations and systems related financial derivatives.

Overview
Managing Derivatives Contracts: A guide to Derivatives Market, Life Cycle, Operations and Systems is a comprehensive book on derivatives market structure, contract life cycle and underlying technology platform. 

While understanding and trading derivatives required in-depth knowledge of derivatives structure and risks associated, managing those derivative contracts and related operations requires in-depth knowledge of market mechanics and systems used across industry. 
Derivatives have received a great deal of attention in recent years, new regulations such as Dodd-Frank Act has changed the landscape of the OTC derivatives market. It is critical that firms firmly understand new market structure, processes and systems to successfully manage their derivatives positions. This book is provides structured study material on life cycle of various types of derivatives contracts, operations and systems involved.

The key areas of covered in this book are  

 study of life cycle of various derivative contracts, including various operations, processes, and events.
 detailed coverage on the entire derivatives market structure, players, and their roles.
 overview of all major derivative product classes and markets.
 introduction to the new landscape of OTC markets resulting regulations such as the Dodd–Frank Act and EMIR.
 thorough analysis of the derivatives technology platform and guidelines in order to build a platform using vendor products, through in-house development or to use a hybrid approach.

References

Finance books